Phillip Jermaine Crosby (born November 5, 1976, in Gastonia, North Carolina) is a former American football fullback who played in the National Football League for the Buffalo Bills from 2001 until 2003. He played college football at the University of Tennessee and Coffeyville Community College.

References

1976 births
Living people
American football fullbacks
Coffeyville Red Ravens football players
Tennessee Volunteers football players
Buffalo Bills players
People from Bessemer City, North Carolina